King Otuo Ogbalakon (Ogbolakon) or King Otuo was the 17th-century warrior-king of Obolo (Andoni) people in the Eastern Niger Delta. Her mother, princess Ariaunwa Okpok-Ogbolikan of Old Unyeada was recorded by history as the first Obolo (Andoni) female monarch to have ruled Unyeada Kingdom as the Queen after the demise of her father, King Ikana Okpok of Edabiri dynasty in the 17th century. Earlier, Princess Ariaunwa married Prince Ogbolaikon of Alabie now known as Agwut-Obolo and begat Otuo. In 1792, when Otuo became of age he was crowned as the King in Old Unyeada Kingdom.
At the fall of Old Unyeada, King Otuo founded the new Unyeada Kingdom in 1827 and relocated the seat of power of the Andoni people from Old Unyeada (Ebon-Akpon). This was as a result of the prolonged war with the Kingdom of Bonny over control of the hinterland market. According many European explorers who visited the Unyeada, described the kingdom as the most progressive settlement and seat of influence of the Obolo people.

King Otuo Ogbolakon ruled over 200 settlements of Obolo Land as a warrior-king. History recorded him as the fiercest warrior-king in the Eastern Niger Delta for standing against of British divide and rule system. The legendary seven-year war between Andoni and the Kingdom of Bonny was severe on the palm oil exports in Liverpool.

Andoni-Bonny Treaty 1846
According to Ejituwu, "The Andoni-Bonny Treaty of 1846, explained that the purported treaty between Bonny and Unyeada was not founded in Unyeada oral tradition. Unyeada tradition accepts the defeat of the town in 1926 but emphasizes that at no time was any treaty made with Bonny in 1926. King Otuo Ogbolakon went ahead to fight and defeated Bonny in 1846. It is important to note the impact of King Otuo Ogbolakon's war on Bonny in the Eastern Delta.

The entry of King Jaja of Opobo into Unyeada (Obolo) territory in 1869 following the Bonny Civil War, would have infringed on the terms of such the ambiguous Treaty; it was said that the Andoni shall fought the enemies of Bonny. In light of the above, many writers including William Balfour Baikie concluded that the purported treaty was not only an illusion but also a diplomatic curiosity by King William Dappa Pepple.

King Otuo Ogbolakon Dynasty

His Eminence King (Dr.) I. U. Otuo IX JP.

References

Niger River Delta
History of Nigeria
Nigerian royalty